Osvaldo Terranova (30 August 1923 – 4 October 1984) was an Argentine film actor.

Terranova made over 50 appearances mostly in film between 1949 and 1985. In the early 1980s he made several TV appearances. His last film was Adios Roberto, which was released in 1985 after his death.

Selected filmography
 From Man to Man (1949)
 The Kidnapper (1958)
 The Party Is Over (1960)
 The Seven Madmen (1973)
 Rebellion in Patagonia (1974)

External links
 

1923 births
1984 deaths
Argentine male film actors
People from Buenos Aires
Argentine people of Italian descent
20th-century Argentine male actors